Thomas Donald Ramsay, known as Tom Ramsay (born December 14, 1939), is a Democratic former Texas state representative, who represented District 8 and 2 from 1992 to 2003. He did not seek reelection in 2002 and was succeeded by the Republican Dan Flynn.

Life
Ramsay was born in Mount Vernon, Texas, to T. Landon Ramsay and Mozelle Coe. In 1962, he earned a bachelor's degree in business administration from Southern Methodist University. He married Laurie Lynn Manning and had four children together.

He served in the Texas Air National Guard for six years and was a founder of the Franklin National Bank.

References

1939 births
Living people
Democratic Party members of the Texas House of Representatives
American bankers
Businesspeople from Texas
People from Robertson County, Texas